Hong is both a town and a Local Government Area in Adamawa State, Nigeria. Hong is the home of the State College of Education.

Government and infrastructure 
The local government administrative headquarters is located within Hong.

The LGA falls under Adamawa Central Senatorial District and Gombi/Hong Federal Constituency. It has 12 political wards that are subdivided into two State Constituencies, with each having six wards. Hong Constituency comprises Bangshika ward, Daksiri ward, Hong ward, Husherizum ward, Shangui ward and Thilbang ward. Uba/Gaya Constituency comprises Garaha ward, Gaya ward, Hildi ward, Kwarhi ward, Mayo-lope ward and Uba ward.

Communities 
Districts in the area include Dugwaba, Gaya, Hildi, Hong, Kulinyi, Pella and Uba.

Notable people
Comrade James Pukuma Executive Chairman of Hong L. G
 Biama Dana Sabiya, President / Chief Executive Officer, Northern Nigerian Affairs Group
 Barr. Boss Gida Mustapha Secretary to the Government of the Federation
 Engr. Babachir David Lawal, politician and former Secretary to the Government of the Federation
 Major General Anthony Haldu Hananiya Rtd. 
 Rt. Hon. James Barka, former acting governor, Adamawa State
 Dr. Idi Aliyu Hong, former minister of State foreign affairs, health and culture and tourism
 Amb. Fati Abubakar Saad (née Yerima Balla)
 Prof. Balla Mathematic University of Maiduguri 
 Prof. Salisu Mustapha former VC FUTY
 Kenedy Barthimaus Pam Sec Ministry of Health Adamawa state.
 Rev. Shall Holma 
 Alh. Yerima Balla
 Brig. Gen Aliyu Kama
 Brig. SB Chama Late
 Brig. Gen YK Musa
 Air commodore TM Chidama
 Naval Commodore Ngatuwa
 Col. Abdallah NDLEA Boss
 Engr. Markus Gundiri
 Hon. Justice Nathan Musa
 Dr. Nat Yaduma
 Dr Louis Mandama former Head of service adamawa state
 Anthone Dunah Ph.D
 Yerima Hassan Mamman Daksiri
 Dan Kade Adamawa Alh. Saleh M. Daksiri
 Engr. Alexander Polycarp
 Nigerian Airspace Management Agency
 Umar Garba Pella Ph.D commissioner of information and strategy adamawa state
 Iliyasu Buba Gashinbaki
 Alhaji Saidu Hayatu Galadima
 Nachamada Geoffrey Kadiri, Conservation Biologist, Project Manager WCS Yankari
 Col. Musa Aliyu Umar Galadima
 Akila Nehemiah Bello Ahida, Sardauna Gaya
 Brig Gen Mohammed Musa Kini
 Adanaya Talmon Gaya, Commissioner of Police
 Dr Aisha Abubakar Baju Woman AIG
 Dr Damana Jamari Gaya
 HH Idris Ibrahim Gaya
 HH Babangida Umar Hong
 HH Simon Buba Dougwaba
 HH Shibu Amanaunda Kulinyi
 HH Mamman Daksiri Pella
 Engr Omar Suleiman
 Saleh Waziri Wassh

References

Populated places in Adamawa State